Miss Universe Vietnam 2022 was the 5th edition of the Miss Universe Vietnam pageant, held at Saigon Exhibition and Convention Center, District 7, Ho Chi Minh City, Vietnam on June 25, 2022. Nguyễn Thị Ngọc Châu was crowned as the winner by her predecessor Nguyễn Trần Khánh Vân and represented Vietnam at Miss Universe 2022, but was unplaced.

Results

Placements
Color keys

§ Voted into Top 16 by viewers.

Special Awards

Miss Beach

Miss Bravery

Best Talent

Best Face

Best in National Costume

Best in Catwalk

Best Introduction

Best Interview

Best Body

Best English Skill

Miss Tiktok

Order of announcements

Top 16
Bùi Quỳnh Hoa
Nguyễn Thị Thanh Khoa
Nguyễn Thị Ngọc Châu
Nguyễn Thị Hương Ly
Huỳnh Phạm Thủy Tiên
Bùi Lý Thiên Hương
Vũ Thúy Quỳnh
Lê Thảo Nhi
Trần Tuyết Như
Ngô Bảo Ngọc
Lê Hoàng Phương
Hoàng Thị Nhung
Đặng Thu Huyền
Nguyễn Thị Lệ Nam
Nguyễn Thị Oanh
Phạm Hoàng Thu Uyên

Top 10
Huỳnh Phạm Thủy Tiên
Nguyễn Thị Hương Ly
Nguyễn Thị Ngọc Châu
Nguyễn Thị Thanh Khoa
Lê Thảo Nhi
Đặng Thu Huyền
Lê Hoàng Phương
Vũ Thúy Quỳnh
Ngô Bảo Ngọc
Bùi Quỳnh Hoa

Top 5
Nguyễn Thị Hương Ly
Lê Thảo Nhi
Lê Hoàng Phương
Huỳnh Phạm Thủy Tiên
Nguyễn Thị Ngọc Châu

Top 3
Lê Thảo Nhi
Huỳnh Phạm Thủy Tiên
Nguyễn Thị Ngọc Châu

Format
In 2022, Miss Universe Vietnam announced the change of some parts of the format, including:

 The number of contestants participating in the final round is only 40 instead of 45 as in previous years.
 The age limit of contestants is raised from 26 years old to 28 years old.
 There will be the Top 16 instead of 15 as in previous years (one contestant will be added based on audience votes)
 There will be a national costume contest accompanied to the MUVN season to find out the best national costume to be the winner's fellow-traveller at Miss Universe 2022
 An unprecedented event, each judge will have a "golden ticket", which can be given to any contestants making a good impression on our tough judges, and that lucky girl will have a special privilege to directly enter the Top 71 semifinals.
 After each broadcast of the program 'I am Miss Universe Vietnam 2022', 5 contestants will be eliminated (except for episode 2, only 3 contestants will be eliminated) and 33 contestants will enter directly. At the press conference of Top 40 contestants, 7 "silver tickets" will be awarded to the contestants who were eliminated in the Top 71 semifinals.

In an unprecedented move, contestant Đỗ Nhật Hà was awarded an honorary "golden ticket" and entered the Top 71 semifinals, becoming the first openly transgender woman to compete in Miss Universe Vietnam.

Contestants

Top 41 final round

Top 71 preliminary

Golden Ticket

Silver Ticket

Judges
 Võ Thị Xuân Trang – John Robert Powers School's Principal.
 Lê Diệp Linh – Anthropometry Doctor.
 Vũ Nguyễn Hà Anh – Model, Singer, and represented Vietnam at Miss Earth 2006.
 H'Hen Niê – Miss Universe Vietnam 2017 and placed as Top 5 at Miss Universe 2018.
 Võ Hoàng Yến – Model, 1st Runner-up of Miss Universe Vietnam 2008 and represented Vietnam at Miss Universe 2009.
 Vũ Thị Hoàng My – 1st Runner-up of Miss Vietnam 2010, Filmmaker, Model, and represented Vietnam at Miss Universe 2011 and Miss World 2012.
 Vũ Thu Phương – Businesswoman and Model.
 Natalie Glebova – Miss Universe 2005 from Canada.
 Catriona Gray – Model, Singer, Host, Miss World 2016 Top 5, and Miss Universe 2018 from the Philippines.
 Harnaaz Kaur Sandhu - Miss Universe 2021 from India.

References

Beauty pageants in Vietnam
2022 beauty pageants
Vietnamese awards